The 1933 All-Ireland Junior Hurling Championship was the 16th staging of the All-Ireland Junior Championship since its establishment by the Gaelic Athletic Association in 1912.

Dublin entered the championship as the defending champions.

The All-Ireland final was played on 5 November 1933 at Croke Park in Dublin, between Tipperary and London, in what was their first meeting in a final. Tipperary won the match by 10–01 to 1–04 to claim their sixth championship title overall and a first title since 1930.

Results

All-Ireland Junior Hurling Championship

All-Ireland home final

All-Ireland final

References

Junior
All-Ireland Junior Hurling Championship